The 1955 Calgary Stampeders finished in 5th place in the W.I.F.U. with a 4–12 record and failed to make the playoffs.

Regular season

Season standings

Season schedule

Awards and records
 None

References

Calgary Stampeders seasons
1955 Canadian football season by team